Dark Pasts: Changing the State's Story in Turkey and Japan (2018) is a book by historian Jennifer Dixon that discusses controversies around Japanese war crimes in World War II and the Armenian genocide denial in Turkey. According to Dixon, states tend to deny rather than glorify their past crimes due to international constraints.

References

Further reading

2018 non-fiction books
History books about Turkey
History books about Japan
Armenian genocide denial
Books about genocide denial
Cornell University Press books